Sandvikens AIK (commonly known as SAIK) a sports club in Sandviken, Sweden. The bandy section plays its home games in the Göransson Arena in Sandviken. They play in a black outfit.

History
Sandvikens AIK was founded on 16 March 1901. Originally named IK Stjärnan, they were the home for the white-collar workers, while IK Kronan (later Sandvikens IF) was the home for blue-collar workers.

Sandvikens AIK began playing bandy in 1922 won the Swedish Bandy Championship for first time 1945.

Squad

Honours

Domestic
 Swedish National Champions:
 Winners (9): 1945, 1946, 1997, 2000, 2002, 2003, 2011, 2012, 2014
 Runners-up (14): 1940, 1941, 1950, 1971, 1977, 1980, 1990, 1996, 1998, 2005, 2008, 2013, 2015, 2017

Cup
 Swedish Cup Champions:
 Winners (6): 2006, 2009, 2010, 2011, 2012, 2018

International
 World Cup:
 Winners (3): 1974, 2002, 2017
 Runners-up (11): 1975, 1989, 1991, 1992, 1994, 2001, 2003, 2004, 2011, 2015, 2018
 Champions Cup:
 Winners (1): 2005
 European Cup:
 Winners (1): 1997
 Runners-up (2): 2002, 2003

Records
 Victory: 22–2 vs. Katrineholms SK (22 November 2009)
 Loss: 2–12 vs. Västerås SK (14 February 1988)
 Highest attendance: 5,880 vs. Vetlanda BK (15 March 1988)
 Most goals scored: 700, Magnus Muhrén (1993–2004, 2007–10, 2013–14)

References

External links
Official website

 
Bandy clubs in Sweden
Sport in Gävleborg County
Bandy clubs established in 1901
1901 establishments in Sweden
Sandviken Municipality